Burt W. Rynders (February 3, 1871 – January 23, 1935) was an American politician, educator, and businessman.

Born in Ellington, Wisconsin, Rynders went to school in Hortonville, Wisconsin and Oshkosh Normal School. He taught school, and was in the real estate and insurance business in Antigo, Wisconsin. Rynders also operated a hotel. Rynders served on the Antigo Common Council and as mayor. He was also president of the Antigo Police and Fire Commission. In 1921, Rynders served in the Wisconsin State Assembly and was a Democrat. Rynders died in Madison, Wisconsin in 1935.

Notes

1871 births
1935 deaths
People from Antigo, Wisconsin
People from Ellington, Wisconsin
University of Wisconsin–Oshkosh alumni
Businesspeople from Wisconsin
Educators from Wisconsin
Wisconsin city council members
Mayors of places in Wisconsin
Democratic Party members of the Wisconsin State Assembly